Zack Gelof (born October 19, 1999) is an American Israeli baseball third baseman in the Oakland Athletics organization. He played college baseball at Virginia. Gelof was selected in the second round of the 2021 Major League Baseball draft by the Athletics. Gelof will play for Team Israel in the 2023 World Baseball Classic in Miami, in March 2023.

High school
Gelof grew up in Rehoboth Beach, Delaware, and attended Cape Henlopen High School. Gelof served as Class President for each of his four years, and played every game of the high school baseball team's four seasons in his years in high school. In his senior year, playing shortstop and pitching, he batted .465 and led the state in hits (35), runs (37), and home runs (7) and was 28-for-28 in stolen bases, along with 17 RBIs. As a pitcher he was 4-0 with a 1.30 ERA, and 34 strikeouts in 26 innings, and threw an 87 miles per hour fastball. He was named 2018 Delaware Gatorade Player of Year, Delaware Baseball Coaches Player of the Year, Delaware News Journal First Team All-State Shortstop, Perfect Game/Rawlings 2018 honorable mention All American and 1st Team Northeast All Region. He finished his high school baseball career as Delaware's all-time leader in runs scored (103) and stolen bases (81-for-81), and second in career hits (105), and was a two-time Henlopen Conference Player of Year as a shortstop and a pitcher. 

He also played soccer for the high school, and finished his career as the leading goal scorer in the State of Delaware for his four-year career span 2015-2018 (61 goals; 16 assists), and was four-time All-Conference, three-time All-State, and as a senior was named Conference Player of the Year. He graduated with a 4.02 GPA.

He was selected in the 38th round of the 2018 Major League Baseball draft by the Cleveland Indians, but Gelof opted not to sign with the team. During the summer after his senior year Gelof played summer collegiate baseball for the Brockton Rox of the Futures Collegiate Baseball League, and played third base. He batted .292/.370/.403 with 9 doubles (10th in the league), 4 triples (3rd), and 13 stolen bases (9th) in 15 attempts.

College
Gelof played college baseball at Virginia in the Atlantic Coast Conference (ACC) for three seasons, starting every game the team played, and batting .316/.396/.478 in 137 games. As a freshman in 2019, he started all 56 games at third base and batted .313/.377/.396 with 16 stolen bases (10th in the ACC) in 19 attempts, and six sacrifice flies (3rd).  He then played for the 2019 Kalamazoo Growlers in the collegiate summer Northwoods League, and batted .349/.426/.490 with three triples (6th in the league) and 22 steals (9th) in 24 attempts, while playing 26 games at third base and two games at shortstop.

As a sophomore in 2020, Gelof batted .349/.469/.746 (leading the ACC) with 24 runs scored (leading the ACC; 4th in the NCAA), six doubles (7th), two triples (4th), five home runs (6th), 18 RBIs (8th), and 13 walks (10th) in 18 games at third base before the season was cut short due to the coronavirus pandemic. He was named a Collegiate Baseball Second Team All-American, and the third-best third baseman in D1Baseball’s 2020 Top-30 Power Rankings. He played for the High Point-Thomasville HiToms of the collegiate summer Coastal Plain League after the season, batting .364/.442/.636.

Gelof was named both Collegiate Baseball and NCBWA 2021 First Team Preseason All-American, and both Baseball America and Perfect Game Second Team Preseason All-American, as well as the D1Baseball No. 5 preseason third baseman. As a junior in 2021 Gelof batted .312/.393/.485 and led the ACC in hits (81), as he also had 50 runs (7th), 18 doubles (4th), 126 total bases (6th), and 12 stolen bases in 13 attempts. He was named second team All-ACC. Virginia played in the 2021 College World Series, and he was named the third baseman on the All-Tournament Team after hitting .583.

Professional career 
Gelof was selected in the second round of the 2021 Major League Baseball draft by the Oakland Athletics. As the 60th pick overall, he was the sixth-highest draft pick in Delaware history. He signed with the team on July 24, 2021, and received a $1,157,400 signing bonus.

In 2021 Gelof was assigned to the Rookie-level Arizona Complex League Athletics to start his professional career, where he played in one game. He was then promoted to the Low-A Stockton Ports, for whom he batted .298/.393/.548. He finished the season with the Las Vegas Aviators of the Triple-A West, where while nearly six years younger than the average player in the league and only two months after playing college baseball, he batted 7-for-12 with 6 RBIs. With the three teams combined, in 2021 he batted .333/.422/.565 in 138 at bats with seven home runs and 13 stolen bases in 15 attempts, while playing third base. MLB.com ranked him as the A's 7th-best prospect, and the 87th-best prospect in baseball, and Fangraphs ranked him as the club's 2nd-best prospect.

In 2022 Gelof ran the fastest 30-yard sprint in the A’s farm system in the spring. He missed almost seven weeks with a torn labrum and subluxed left (non-throwing) shoulder suffered in May when he dove for a ground ball, but playing for the Midland RockHounds of the Class AA Texas League he hit .271/.356/.438 with 13 home runs and nine stolen bases in 11 attempts in 354 at bats over 83 games. He played 53 games at second base, 26 games at third base, seven games at DH, and one game in center field. MLB.com ranked him the #97 prospect in baseball, and the A's #4 prospect. He then played nine games at second base for the Class AAA Las Vegas Aviators of the Pacific Coast League. He slashed .257/.316/.714 with five home runs in 35 at bats. A’s assistant general manager Billy Owens said: "Zack Gelof is a dynamic athlete. He’s a plus, plus runner. He’s got serious strength. I see the plate discipline improving as he climbs the ladder. At some point, I see him also going to the outfield and using that dynamic athleticism all around the diamond." He played for the Mesa Solar Sox in the 2022 Arizona Fall League.

Team Israel; World Baseball Classic

Gelof will play for Team Israel in the 2023 World Baseball Classic in Miami, starting March 11–15, 2023. He will be playing for Team Israel manager and former All-Star Ian Kinsler, and alongside All-Star outfielder Joc Pederson and starting pitcher Dean Kremer, among others.

Personal life
Gelof is the son of Kelly and Adam Gelof, both of whom are attorneys. His younger brother Jake Gelof plays baseball as a first baseman for the University of Virginia; Jake has been Zack's teammate in both high school and college.

References

External links 

Virginia Cavaliers bio

1999 births
Living people
Minor league baseball players
People from Rehoboth Beach, Delaware
Virginia Cavaliers baseball players
Arizona Complex League Athletics players
Stockton Ports players
Las Vegas Aviators players
Midland RockHounds players
Mesa Solar Sox players
2023 World Baseball Classic players